Gaz Shahan (also Romanized as Gaz Shāhān and Goz Shāhān) is a village in Dalgan Rural District, in the Central District of Dalgan County, Sistan and Baluchestan Province, Iran. At the 2006 census, its population was 437, in 84 families.

References 

Populated places in Dalgan County